Michael Price (born 4 March 1983) is an English professional footballer who played as a goalkeeper.

Career
Price began his career with Leicester City, but his contract was not renewed through his latter term and undertook a month's loan at Boston United in February 2003. Price then featured in Darlington's pre-season fixtures of 2003, earning him a short-term contract and kept a clean sheet in each of his first three of his 39 League and League Cup appearances for the Quakers. He was nonetheless allowed to move to Harrogate Town in 2005, joining Gateshead a year later in 2006, only to be hit with a serious injury after a mere 8 games and then represented Bridlington Town.

References

Since 1888... The Searchable Premiership and Football League Player Database (subscription required)

External links

1983 births
Living people
English footballers
Leicester City F.C. players
Boston United F.C. players
Darlington F.C. players
Harrogate Town A.F.C. players
Gateshead F.C. players
English Football League players
National League (English football) players
Northern Premier League players
Sportspeople from Ashington
Footballers from Northumberland
Association football goalkeepers